Tai Lue (Tai Lü: , kam tai lue,) or Tai Lɯ, Tai Lü, Thai Lue, Tai Le, Xishuangbanna Dai (phasa thai lue, ;  or ), is a Tai language of the Lu people, spoken by about 700,000 people in Southeast Asia. This includes 280,000 people in China (Yunnan), 200,000 in Burma, 134,000 in Laos, 83,000 in Thailand and 4,960 in Vietnam. The language is similar to other Tai languages and is closely related to Kham Mueang or Tai Yuan, which is also known as Northern Thai language. In Yunnan, it is spoken in all of Xishuangbanna Dai Autonomous Prefecture, as well as Jiangcheng Hani and Yi Autonomous County in Pu'er City.

In Vietnam, Tai Lue speakers are officially recognised as the Lự ethnic minority, although in China they are classified as part of the Dai people, along with speakers of the other Tai languages apart from Zhuang.

Phonology 
Tai Lue has 21 syllable-initial consonants, 9 syllable-finals and six tones (three different tones in checked syllables, six in open syllables).

Consonants

Initials 

(Some textbooks denote  as ).

Finals

Vowels 

Generally, vowels in open syllables (without codas) occur as long whereas ones in closed syllables are short (except  and ).

Tones

Contrastive tones in unchecked syllables 
There are six tones for unchecked syllables, although only three are allowed in checked syllables (those ending with -p, -t or -k).

Contrastive tones in checked syllables 

Grammar

Pronouns

Syntax 
Word order is usually subject–verb–object (SVO); modifiers (e.g. adjectives) follow nouns.

Interrogatives

Vocabulary
As in Thai and Lao, Tai Lue has borrowed many Sanskrit and Pali words and affixes. Among the Tai languages in general, Tai Lue has limited intelligibility with Shan and Tai Nua and shares much vocabulary with, the other Southwestern Tai languages. Tai Lue has 95% lexical similarity with Northern Thai (Lanna), 86% with Central Thai, 93% with Shan, and 95% with Khun.

Below, some Thai Lue words are given with standard Central Thai equivalents for comparison. Thai words are shown on the left and Tai Lue words, written in New Tai Lue script, are shown on the right.

Different words
Many words differ from Thai greatly:
ยี่สิบ → ᨪᩣ᩠ᩅ (twenty; cf. Lao: /sáːw/, Northern Thai: /sāw/)
พูด → ᩋᩪᩢ (to speak; cf. Northern Thai: /ʔu᷇ː/)
พี่ชาย → ᩋᩢᩣ᩠ᨿ (older brother; cf. Lao: /ʔâːj/, Northern Thai: /ʔa᷇ːj/)

Similar words
Some words differ in tone only:
หนึ่ง → ᨶ᩠ᨦᩧ᩵ (one)
หก → ᩉᩫ᩠ᨠ (six)
เจ็ด → ᩮᨧ᩠ᨯ (seven)
สิบ → ᩈᩥ᩠ᨷ (ten)
กิน  → ᨠᩥ᩠ᨶ (to eat)

Some words differ in a single sound and associated tone. In many words, the initial ร in Thai is ฮ in Tai Lue, as is also the case in Lao and Tai Yuan:
ร้อน → ᩁᩢᩬᩁ  (hot; cf. Lao: /hɔ̂n/, Northern Thai: /hɔ́ːn/)
รัก → ᩁᩢ᩠ᨠ (to love; cf. Lao: /hāk/, Northern Thai: /ha᷇k/)
รู้ → ᩁᩪᩢ (to know; cf. Lao: /hûː/, Northern Thai: /húː/)

Aspirated consonants in the low-class consonant group(อักษรต่ำ ) become unaspirated:
เชียงราย → ᨩ᩠ᨿᨦᩁᩣ᩠ᨿ (Chiang Rai city and province)
คิด → ᨣᩧ᩠ᨯ (to think; cf. Northern Thai: /kɯ́t/)
พ่อ → ᨻᩳ᩵ (father; cf. Northern Thai: /pɔ̂ː/)
ทาง → ᨴᩤ᩠ᨦ (way; cf. Northern Thai: /tāːŋ/)

(Note that the vowels also differ greatly between Tai Lue and Thai in many words, even though they are etymologically related and share the same root.)

Though many aspirated consonants often become unaspirated, when an unaspirated consonant is followed by ร the unaspirated consonant becomes aspirated:
ประเทศ → ᨷᩕᨴᩮ᩠ᩆ (country; cf. Northern Thai /pʰa.têːt/)

Other differences:
ให้ → ᩉᩨᩢ (to give, let)

Numbers

Writing systems 
Tai Lue is written in three different scripts. One is the Fak Kham script, a variety of the Thai script of Sukhothai. The second is the Tham script, which was reformed in the 1950s, but is still in use and has recently regained government support. The new script is a simplified version of the old script.

Fak Kham 
An ancient script, also used in Kengtung, Northern Thailand and Northern Laos centuries ago.

Tham 
The Tham script is called 老傣文 lao dai wen (Old laos script) in Chinese. Readable by the most people in Burma, Laos, Thailand and Vietnam.

New Tai Lue 

New Tai Lue is a modernization of the Lanna alphabet (also known as the Tai Tham script), which is similar to the Thai alphabet, and consists of 42 initial consonant signs (21 high-tone class, 21 low-tone class), seven final consonant signs, 16 vowel signs, two tone letters and one vowel shortening letter (or syllable-final glottal stop). Vowels signs can be placed before or after the syllable initial consonant.

Similar to the Thai alphabet, the pronunciation of the tone of a syllable depends on the class the initial consonant belongs to, syllable structure and vowel length, and the tone mark.

Related varieties
The Bajia people (八甲人), who number 1,106 individuals in Mengkang Village, Meng'a Town, Menghai County, Yunnan, speak a language closely related to Tai Lue. There are 225 Bajia people living in Jingbo Township 景播乡, Menghai County (You 2013:270). The Bajia are also known as the Chinese Dai 汉傣.

See also 
 Tai Nüa language

 Tai Dam language

References

Further reading 

  – This is a dictionary of Tai Lue in unreformed spelling.

External links
 SeaSite: Tai Lue, under construction
 Omniglot - Tai Lue script
 Tai Lue dictionary online

 
Languages of China
Languages of Myanmar
Languages of Laos
Languages of Thailand
Languages of Vietnam